The following is a list of the 23 cantons of the Seine-et-Marne department, in France, following the French canton reorganisation which came into effect in March 2015:

 Champs-sur-Marne
 Chelles
 Claye-Souilly
 Combs-la-Ville
 Coulommiers
 La Ferté-sous-Jouarre
 Fontainebleau
 Fontenay-Trésigny
 Lagny-sur-Marne
 Meaux
 Melun
 Mitry-Mory
 Montereau-Fault-Yonne
 Nangis
 Nemours
 Ozoir-la-Ferrière
 Pontault-Combault
 Provins
 Saint-Fargeau-Ponthierry
 Savigny-le-Temple
 Serris
 Torcy
 Villeparisis

References